Reschensee (Italian: Lago di Resia ) or Lake Reschen is an artificial lake in the western portion of South Tyrol, Italy, approximately  south of the Reschen Pass, which forms the border with Austria, and  east of the mountain ridge forming the border with Switzerland. With its capacity of 120 million cubic metres (97,000 ac·ft) it is the largest lake in the province. Its surface area of  makes it also the largest lake above  in the Alps. It is fed by the Adige, Rojenbach and Karlinbach and drained by the Adige.

The lake is famous for the steeple of a submerged 14th-century church; when the water freezes, this can be reached on foot. A legend says that during winter one can still hear church bells ring. In reality the bells were removed from the tower on July 18, 1950, a week before the demolition of the church nave and the creation of the lake.

Origins
Plans for a smaller (5 m deep) artificial lake date from 1920. In July 1939, the Montecatini company (now Edison Energia) introduced a new plan for a -deep lake, which would unify two natural lakes (Reschensee and Mittersee) and submerge several villages, including Graun and part of Reschen. The creation of the dam started in April 1940 pursuant to this second plan but, due to the war and local resistance, did not finish until July 1950. 

In 1947 Montecatini received 30 million Swiss francs from the Swiss company  for the construction of the dam (in exchange for 10 years of seasonal electricity), paradoxically after the population of Splügen had voted against the company's plans to build a dam that would have submerged that Swiss village. Graun's population did not have such success, despite the willing ear of Antonio Segni who later became Italy's prime minister.

References

External links

 Reschensee Ship Tours
Visiting  Reschensee

Lakes of South Tyrol
Artificial lakes of Italy